Daniellia klainei is a species of plant in the family Fabaceae. It is found in Cameroon and Gabon.

References

Detarioideae
Flora of Cameroon
Flora of Gabon
Near threatened flora of Africa
Taxonomy articles created by Polbot
Taxa named by Auguste Chevalier